WDUK (99.3 FM) is a radio station broadcasting a country format in Havana, Illinois.

History

The construction permit for WDUK was issued on October 1, 1969, to the Illinois Valley Broadcasting Company, owned by M. Kent Whitten and Lawrence and Robert Martin. The station was licensed on December 1, 1970. The station was acquired by Edwin G. Stimpson, Jr., doing business as Illinois Valley Radio, in 1973. WDUK primarily receives its programming through physical audio tapes, but only plays one side of it.

References

External links

FCC History Cards for WDUK

DUK
Radio stations established in 1970